Édouard Didron (1836-1902) was a French stained glass artist and art writer.

Biography

Early life
Édouard Amedée Didron was born on 13 October 1836 in Paris. His father was Mr Fiot and his mother, Ms Didron. His uncle, the archeologist and art historian Adolphe Napoléon Didron (1806-1867), adopted him.

Career
He designed the stained glass in the Église Saint-Vincent-de-Paul in Marseille. He also designed stained glass in the Église Sainte-Rosalie in Paris, the Église Saint-Christophe in Cergy, the Église Saint-Ouen in Le Tronquay, the Église Notre-Dame in Neufchâtel-en-Bray, the Cathédrale Saint-Maclou de Pontoise in Pontoise, the Basilica of St. Sernin in Toulouse, the Eglise Notre Dame de Carentan and the Cathédrale Saint-Front de Périgueux in Périgueux.

Additionally, he wrote many books about art. He denounced the "bastardization" of Gothic art, which meant the decoration of bars and private residences with medieval and mock-medieval works. He was also the editor of Annales Archéologiques from 1867 to 1872.

Death
He died on 14 April 1902 in Paris.

List of Works

France
 Église Saint-Vincent-de-Paul, Marseille, Bouches-du-Rhône
 Cathedrale Saint-Front, Périgueux, Dordogne
 Eglise Saint-Ouen, Le Tronquay, Eure
 Basilica de Saint-Sernin, Toulouse, Haute-Garonne
 Sainte-Roslie, Paris, Île-de-France
 Eglise Notre-Dame, Neufchâtel-en-Bray, Seine-Maritime
 Saint-Christophe Church, Créteil, Val-de-Marne
 Cathedrale Saint-Maclou, Pontoise, Val-d'Oise

United Kingdom
 St. Mary's Church, Feltwell, Norfolk

Bibliography
Nicolas-Marie-Joseph Chapuy, Édouard Didron, Allemagne monumentale et pittoresque: ou ses vues et ses monuments (accompagnés de notes historiques) (Goupil & Vibert, 1845).
Édouard Didron, Vitraux du Grand-Andely, (Librairie archéologique de Victor Didron, 1863).
Édouard Didron, Les vitraux à l'expossition universelle de 1867 (Librairie archéologique de Victor Didron, 1868).
Édouard Didron, Quelques Mots sur l'Art Chrétien à propos de l'Image du Sacré-Cœur (1874).
Édouard Didron, Louis Clémandot, Exposition Universelle Internationale de 1878 À Paris. Groupe III. Classe 19. Rapport Sur Les Cristaux, la Verrerie, Et Les Vitraux. (1880).
Édouard Didron, Catalogue de la bibliothèque iconographique et archéologique de feu (Emile-Paul, 1903, 87 pages).

Gallery

References

Artists from Paris
French stained glass artists and manufacturers
1836 births
1902 deaths